Harold Johnston Brodie (December 3, 1907 – March 23, 1989) was a Canadian mycologist, known for his contributions to the knowledge of the Nidulariaceae, or bird's nest fungi.

Early life

Harold Brodie was born in Winnipeg, Manitoba, Canada, on December 3, 1907, and grew up there. After receiving his BSc from the University of Manitoba in 1929, he worked on his MSc under the direction of Arthur Henry Reginald Buller. In this research he investigated the functions of the oidia of the mushroom Coprinus lagopus (now known as Coprinopsis radiata); this research led to the two publications in 1931 and 1932.

Awards

Brodie was awarded a Guggenheim fellowship in 1952. He also received the Canada Centennial Medal in 1967, and the Lawson Medal of the Canadian Botanical Association in 1977.

Works

References

1907 births
1989 deaths
Canadian mycologists
People from Winnipeg
University of Manitoba alumni
20th-century Canadian botanists